The Hot Space Tour was the ninth headlining concert tour by the British rock band Queen in support of their 1982 album Hot Space. The tour started on the 9th of April in Gothenburg, Sweden and ended, after sixty-nine concerts, in Tokorozawa, Japan on the 3rd of November.

Background
The tour saw many changes to Queen's show. The tour was the first in which the band used a keyboardist, playing in the background. For the European leg of the tour, they used Morgan Fisher. Fisher is best known for having been a member of Mott the Hoople in the 1970s. Queen were the opening act for Mott the Hoople's US Tour of 1974, so the band already had close connections with Fisher prior to the tour. Another connection which Fisher had with the band was through a short-lived progressive rock band called Morgan, which he formed with Tim Staffell, who was the bass guitarist and lead vocalist for the pre-Queen band Smile.

Unlike most tours, in which the band would normally only need a few nights to become comfortable with a setlist, it would take more than a month during the start of the tour. All of the shows in April are unique as the band are undergoing an experimental period, before finally achieving an optimal setlist outline by May. The band would still continue to experiment throughout the year.
Most songs from the Hot Space album would be played on this tour, with "Action This Day" and "Under Pressure" being performed at every single show. Since the album itself was released on 21 May (the first night in Munich), fans at shows from the start of the tour until then would have been unfamiliar with the songs "Staying Power", "Back Chat" and "Action This Day". "Body Language" was introduced to the show briefly in May, before making a permanent return in July, and "Calling All Girls" would be introduced in July as well. "Life Is Real" would be heard at only a few concerts in August, and "Put Out The Fire" would be briefly introduced to the show in August, before permanently returning in September. "The Hero", "Sheer Heart Attack" and most of the fast version of "We Will Rock You" were dropped from July onwards, although the former would appear on the Japanese leg, and the latter would be re-introduced in September. Sheer Heart Attack would appear at least once on the North American leg of the tour, with Liar rumoured to have a performance in August.

Queen toured Europe, North America, and Japan throughout 1982. Several alterations were made to the touring schedule. The first being the cancellation of a planned concert at the Royal Albert Hall in London, due to the venue not being able to cope with the weight of the band's light rig. The second were two rescheduled concerts in England. The concert in Leeds was originally scheduled to take place at Old Trafford in Manchester and the Milton Keynes concert was supposed to take place at Arsenal Stadium in London. The concerts were moved due to potential noise complaints from local residents.

A DVD documenting the band's 5 June 1982 concert at the National Bowl in Milton Keynes was released in 2004 as Queen on Fire – Live at the Bowl. The DVD Extras contained video clips and audio clips recorded in Austria and Japan. The Japanese clips were recorded in Tokorozawa on the 3rd of November, 1982. They were released in Japan in 1983 simply as "Queen: Live in Japan", although the footage was trimmed down to 60 minutes.

The Hot Space Tour marked Queen's last concerts in North America to feature Freddie Mercury and John Deacon. Brian May and Roger Taylor returned to perform in the United States, along with Paul Rodgers, on the Queen + Paul Rodgers Tour.

Queen dropped several popular songs on stage after this tour, including the fast We Will Rock You, Action This Day, Play The Game, Put Out The Fire, Save Me, Get Down Make Love, Calling All Girls, Fat Bottomed Girls, Body Language and Teo Torriatte. After this tour, Queen would take a nearly two-year long break from touring, where they recorded "The Works". During this downtime, Brian May worked on the "Star Fleet Project" with various other artists, Roger Taylor worked on his solo album "Strange Frontier", and Freddie Mercury would work on his debut solo album "Mr. Bad Guy", which would feature the touring keyboardist Fred Mandel. He would be succeeded by Spike Edney on The Works Tour.

Setlist

Average setlist
This setlist is representative of the performance on 5 June 1982 in Milton Keynes, England. It does not represent all the setlists for the duration of the tour.
"Flash (tape)"
"The Hero"
"We Will Rock You (Fast)"
"Action This Day"
"Play The Game"
"Staying Power"
"Somebody To Love"
"Now I'm Here"
"Dragon Attack"
"Now I'm Here (Reprise)"
"Love Of My Life"
"Save Me"
"Back Chat"
"Get Down, Make Love"
"Guitar Solo"
"Under Pressure"
"Fat Bottomed Girls"
"Crazy Little Thing Called Love"
"Bohemian Rhapsody"
"Tie Your Mother Down"Encore
"Another One Bites The Dust"
"Sheer Heart Attack"Encore
"We Will Rock You"
"We Are The Champions"
"God Save The Queen"

Selected setlists

Tour dates

Box office score data

Personnel
Queen
 Freddie Mercury – lead vocals, piano, acoustic guitar (on "Crazy Little Thing Called Love")
 Brian May – electric guitar, acoustic guitar, backing vocals, piano
 Roger Taylor – drums, backing vocals
 John Deacon – bass guitar, additional vocals, electric guitar (on "Staying Power")
Additional musicians
 Morgan Fisher – keyboards, piano (Europe)
 Fred Mandel – keyboards, piano (North America and Japan)

References

External links
Queen Concerts

Queen (band) concert tours
1982 concert tours